The 1948 NC State Wolfpack football team represented North Carolina State University during the 1948 college football season. The Wolfpack were led by fifth-year head coach Beattie Feathers and played their home games at Riddick Stadium in Raleigh, North Carolina. They competed as members of the Southern Conference.

Schedule

References

NC State
NC State Wolfpack football seasons
NC State Wolfpack football